Gudrun Pflüger (born 18 August 1972) is a former Austrian mountain runner four-time winner of the World Mountain Running Championships (1992, 1994, 1995, 1996).

Biography
After completing the sport activity, she has been a traveling biologist in British Columbia, Canada, engaging in the study and conservation of wolves. During one field trip, Pflüger was spotted by the wolves she was studying and lay prone in the grass in order to try and lure them closer.

Books

References

External links
 Gudrun Pflüger profile at Association of Road Racing Statisticians
 

1972 births
Living people
Austrian mountain runners